Functional testing in manufacturing (FCT) is a test typically performed during the last phase of the production line. This is often referred to as a final quality control test, which is done to ensure that specifications are carried out by FCTs.

The process of FCTs is entailed by the emulation or simulation of the environment in which a product is expected to operate. This is done so to check, and correct any issues with functionality. The environment involved with FCTs consists of any device that communicates with an DUT, the power supply of said DUT, and any loads needed to make the DUT function correctly.

FCTs uses customer specific connectors, rather than a test point on the PCB.

Functional tests are performed in an automatic fashion by production line operators using test software. In order for this to be completed, the software will communicate with any external programmable instruments such as I/O boards, digital multimeters, and communication ports. In conjunction with the test fixture, the software that interfaces with the DUT is what makes it possible for a FCT to be performed.

Typical vendors 

Agilent Technologies
Keysight
Circuit Check
National Instruments
Teradyne
Flex (company)
6TL engineering

See also 

 Acceptance testing

References 

Electronic engineering
Hardware testing
Electronic test equipment